

The Pangong Range is a mountain range in the northern Indian region of Ladakh that runs parallel to the Ladakh Range about 100 km northwest from Chushul, along the southern shore of the Pangong Lake. Its highest range is 6,700 m (22,000 ft), and the northern slopes are heavily glaciated.

References

Bibliography 
 
 
 

Geography of Ladakh